The Duck Store is the bookstore for the University of Oregon in Eugene, Oregon, United States. It is a not-for-profit corporation governed by an elected Board of Directors composed mostly of students. It is independent of the University of Oregon as the UO does not own or operate any retail stores and has no role in the management or operation of the Bookstore or receive any profits. It serves primarily students, faculty, staff and alumni of the University of Oregon.

Departments and other stores
The main store across the street of the UO campus is divided into five departments:
 Books (on the second floor) provides class texts and general interest books
 Art & School (on the lower ground floor) provides art and school supplies
 Sportswear provides sportswear and Oregon memorabilia
 Technology provides computers and electronics
 Café coffee bar, food, and study area

In addition to its main location, there are ten other stores across the state that predominantly sell sportswear and memorabilia. In Eugene there are stores at Autzen Stadium, Valley River Center, Knight Law Center (on campus), the Student Recreation Center (on campus), and when games are hosted at Autzen Stadium and Matthew Knight Arena each has a specialty store that opens. In Portland there are stores at Washington Square Mall, Clackamas Town Center and the White Stag Block, and there is one Duck Store in Bend.

History
The first University of Oregon bookstore was organized by the Associated Students of the University of Oregon (ASUO) in 1916 in a rented house that was on the site of the present store. After World War I, the ASUO found itself in financial difficulty and sold the bookstore to a local druggist.  By 1920, it became clear that the university needed a bookstore, and a supporter from Portland, stationer J. K. Gill, set up the University of Oregon Cooperative Store. Stock in a separate corporation, the University Supply Company, was sold to department heads and faculty, including university president Prince Lucien Campbell. By 1933, the bookstore was financially solvent and the supply company was dissolved.

The bookstore changed locations several times. In 1959, the Board of Directors voted to buy the College Side Inn, which was located at 13th and Kincaid streets, the site of the present bookstore.  A new bookstore building was completed in 1961, with several additions being made to it since then.

In keeping with the not-for-profit mission of the bookstore, students, faculty and staff of the U of O receive everyday discounts off publisher's suggested prices on all course texts.

References

External links
The Duck Store

Independent bookstores of the United States
University of Oregon
1920 establishments in Oregon